Irakli Toçi (born 30 June 1981) is an Albanian retired football player who played for KS Gramozi Ersekë, KS Luftëtari Gjirokastër and KF Elbasani in the Albanian Superliga.

External links

 Profile - FSHF

1981 births
Living people
Footballers from Elbasan
Albanian footballers
Association football goalkeepers
KS Sopoti Librazhd players
KF Elbasani players
Luftëtari Gjirokastër players
KS Turbina Cërrik players
KS Gramozi Ersekë players
Kategoria Superiore players
Kategoria e Parë players
Kategoria e Dytë players